Greg Goggans (born December 5, 1957) is an American politician who served in the Georgia State Senate from the 7th district from 2005 to 2013. He won his first election in 2005, after the retirement of Peg Blitch left an open seat in the seventh district. Goggans resided in Douglas, and was an orthodontist before pursuing political office.

References

1957 births
Living people
Republican Party Georgia (U.S. state) state senators
American orthodontists